Betsuin-mae is a Hiroden station on Hiroden Yokogawa Line, located in Hirose-kita-machi, Nishi-ku, Hiroshima. It is operated by the Hiroshima Electric Railway.

Routes
There are two routes that serve Betsuin-mae Station:
 Yokogawa Station - Hiroden-honsha-mae Route
 Yokogawa Station - Eba Route

Station layout
The station consists of two side platforms serving two tracks. There are roofs providing shelter for the whole length of the platforms. Access to the platforms is via a crosswalk.

Adjacent stations

Surrounding area
Hongan-ji Hiroshima Betsuin

History
Opened as "Yokogawa-bashi" on November 1, 1917
Renamed to the present name "Betsuin-mae" in 1926.

See also

Hiroden Streetcar Lines and Routes

References

Betsuin-mae Station
Railway stations in Japan opened in 1917